Giovanni Battista Bonacina (born c. 1620) was an Italian painter and engraver of the Baroque period. He was born in Milan. He was influenced by Cornelis Bloemaert. He made portraits of Pope Clement IX, Guido and Hermes Visconti, and Giovanni Battista Conte Truchi. He also engraved The Alliance of Jacob and Laban and St. Martin kneeling before the Virgin and Infant Jesus after Pietro da Cortona, and  a Holy Family, with St. Catharine and St. John after Andrea del Sarto.

References

17th-century Italian painters
Italian male painters
Italian engravers
Italian Baroque painters
Painters from Milan
Year of death unknown
1620 births